The 1984 United States presidential election in Missouri took place on November 6, 1984. All 50 states and the District of Columbia, were part of the 1984 United States presidential election. Voters chose 11 electors to the Electoral College, which selected the president and vice president of the United States.

Missouri was won by incumbent United States President Ronald Reagan of California, who was running against former Vice President Walter Mondale of Minnesota. Reagan ran for a second time with former C.I.A. Director George H. W. Bush of Texas, and Mondale ran with Representative Geraldine Ferraro of New York, the first major female candidate for the vice presidency.

The presidential election of 1984 was a perfectly partisan election in Missouri, with 100% of the electorate voting for either the Democratic or the Republican nominee, as only those two appeared on the ballot. Accordingly, every county gave either Mondale or Reagan an outright majority: five (including the county-equivalent of the city of St Louis) gave Mondale a majority; the rest gave Reagan one. Reagan's strongest performance was in Gasconade County, which gave him 80.54% of its ballots; Mondale's was in the city of St Louis, which gave him 64.80%. 

Missouri weighed in for this election as 2 percentage points more Republican than the national average. Reagan won the state in a landslide, amassing over 60% of the vote, slightly more than his national vote share. He performed particularly strongly in its largest county or county-equivalent, suburban St Louis County (which does not include the city of St Louis), where he got 64% of the vote. He also got over 2/3 of the vote in the Show-Me State's fourth-largest county, historically Republican Greene County (home of Springfield). Mondale scored a strong win in the city of St Louis, where he got 64.8%, and eked out a narrow victory in Jackson County, home of Kansas City. However, he could not match Reagan in rural and small-town Missouri; aside from Jackson County and the city of St Louis, Mondale had only three other wins in Missouri's counties and county-equivalents, with his only convincing win being in the historically secessionist and highly unionized Lead Belt county of Reynolds County (he also narrowly won Oregon and Mississippi Counties). Reagan became the first Republican nominee to sweep Missouri's 'Little Dixie' region, as he became the first Republican ever to carry Monroe County. This feat was repeated by George W. Bush in 2004 (and, excluding Boone County, home to the University of Missouri, by every subsequent Republican nominee as of 2020).

Democratic platform
Walter Mondale accepted the Democratic nomination for presidency after pulling narrowly ahead of Senator Gary Hart of Colorado and Rev. Jesse Jackson of Illinois - his main contenders during what would be a very contentious Democratic primary. During the campaign, Mondale was vocal about reduction of government spending, and, in particular, was vocal against heightened military spending on the nuclear arms race against the Soviet Union, which was reaching its peak on both sides in the early 1980s.

Taking a (what was becoming the traditional liberal) stance on the social issues of the day, Mondale advocated for gun control, the right to choose regarding abortion, and strongly opposed the repeal of laws regarding institutionalized prayer in public schools. He also criticized Reagan for his economic marginalization of the poor, stating that Reagan's reelection campaign was "a happy talk campaign," not focused on the real issues at hand.

A very significant political move during this election: the Democratic Party nominated Representative Geraldine Ferraro to run with Mondale as Vice-President. Ferraro is the first female candidate to receive such a nomination in United States history. She said in an interview at the 1984 Democratic National Convention that this action "opened a door which will never be closed again," speaking to the role of women in politics.

Republican platform

By 1984, Reagan was very popular with voters across the nation as the President who saw them out of the economic stagflation of the early and middle 1970's, and into a period of (relative) economic stability.

The economic success seen under Reagan was politically accomplished (principally) in two ways. The first was initiation of deep tax cuts for the wealthy, and the second was a wide-spectrum of tax cuts for crude oil production and refinement, namely, with the 1980 Windfall profits tax cuts. These policies were augmented with a call for heightened military spending, the cutting of social welfare programs for the poor, and the increasing of taxes on those making less than $50,000 per year. Collectively called "Reaganomics", these economic policies were established through several pieces of legislation passed between 1980 and 1987.

These new tax policies also arguably curbed several existing tax loopholes, preferences, and exceptions, but Reaganomics is typically remembered for its trickle down effect of taxing poor Americans more than rich ones. Reaganomics has (along with legislation passed under presidents George H. W. Bush and Bill Clinton) been criticized by many analysts as "setting the stage" for economic troubles in the United States after 2007, such as the Great Recession.

Virtually unopposed during the Republican primaries, Reagan ran on a campaign of furthering his economic policies. Reagan vowed to continue his "war on drugs," passing sweeping legislation after the 1984 election in support of mandatory minimum sentences for drug possession.  Furthermore, taking a (what was becoming the traditional conservative) stance on the social issues of the day, Reagan strongly opposed legislation regarding comprehension of gay marriage, abortion, and (to a lesser extent) environmentalism, regarding the final as simply being bad for business.

Results

Results by county

See also
 United States presidential elections in Missouri
 Presidency of Ronald Reagan

References

Missouri
1984
1984 Missouri elections